The Diocese of Quilon is a Latin Church ecclesiastical jurisdiction or diocese of the Catholic Church based in the southern Indian city of Kollam. It is a suffragan in the ecclesiastical province of the metropolitan Archdiocese of Trivandrum. The Diocese of Quilon covers an area of 1,950 km2 (753 square miles) that contains a population of some 4.8 million.  At least 4.8% of the people in the area are Catholic. 

The history of the Latin Church in Quilon begins with the erection of a diocese on 9 August 1329. This diocese was later suppressed. The present day Diocese of Quilon was established as a apostolic vicariate on 15 March 1853 by bifurcating the Apostolic Vicariate of Verapoly. It was elevated as a diocese on 1 September 1886.

, Paul Antony Mullassery is the bishop of the Diocese of Quilon.

History

Early history
According to tradition, St. Thomas the Apostle established seven churches along the southern part of west coast of India, and Quilon (pronounced Koy-lon) is the second in the list of the above seven churches.

John of Monte Corvino, a member of the Societas Peregrinantium Pro Christo on his way to China, landed in Quilon in 1291 and ministered the Christian community. The Venetian traveller Marco Polo who visited India in 1292 testified to the presence of a Christian community in Quilon.

Erection of the diocese its first bishop

Since the latter half of the 13th century, Quilon became the chief centre of missionary expeditions. Franciscan and Dominican Missionaries in the 13th and 14th centuries visited Quilon and their letters confirm the existence of a vibrant Christian community in Quilon.

In 1329 Pope John XXII, from the Holy See then in Avignon (France), erected Quilon as the first Diocese in the whole of Indies as suffragan to the Archdiocese of  Soltaniyeh in Persia through the decree "Romanus Pontifex" dated 9 August 1329 By a separate bull, "Venerabili Fratri Jordano", the same Pope, on 21 August 1329 appointed the French or Catalan Dominican friar Jordanus Catalani as the first Bishop of Quilon.

(Copies of the Orders and the related letters issued by Pope John XXII to Bishop Jordanus Catalani and to the diocese of Quilon are documented and preserved in the diocesan archives. Also reprinted in the Indian Church History Classics, Vol.I, The Nazranies, South Asia Research Assistance Services, Ed. Prof. George Menachery, Ollur, 1998.)

The ancient diocese of Quilon had extensive jurisdiction over modern nations of India, Pakistan, Afghanistan, Bangladesh, Burma and Sri Lanka.

Jordanus Catalani arrived in Surat in 1320. After his ministry in Gujarat he reached Quilon in 1323. He not only revived Christianity but also brought hundreds to the Christian fold. He might have come again to Quilon as the bishop in 1330 to build the church at Quilon, known as St. George of the Latins. George happened to be the patron saint of the Catalans, besides being popular among other Christian communities on the Malabar coast. His book "Mirabilia Descripta" is a rare work on plants, animals and the people of India and of other countries in Asia and this is an authoritative work on India dating 700 years back. This book is considered to be a landmark chronicle of its time written around 1327.

The first Latin Bishop of Quilon was received with great jubilation by the faithful of Quilon. He brought a message of good wishes from the Pope to the local rulers. As the first Latin bishop in India, he was also entrusted with the duty of spiritual nourishment of the Christian community in Calicut, Mangalore, Thane and Baruch (Gujarat). According to Portuguese sources, written more than two centuries later, he was martyred by Muslims in Bombay in 1336, as much as the four Franciscan friars that he had to bury, fifteen years before, in the very same place (one of them, Thomas of Tolentino, was beatified). In the year 1348 John De Marignoli, the Papal Legate to China on his way back to Rome sojourned here for 14 months. With the martyrdom of the first Latin Bishop, the See of Quilon remained vacant. There was a 'historic gap' with regard to ecclesiastical administration in India till the Portuguese landed here in 1498 AD.

It follows from the Friar Jordanus tradition that Catholicism – not just Christianity – is deep rooted in Quilon. It is now settled that Latin Catholicism was brought to Kerala in the early 14th century by this Catalan or Occitan speaking Dominican. It is now evident that while Bishop Jordanus introduced Latin Catholicism, the Portuguese popularized it. In the 1340s, an Italian friar called Marignolli called on Kollam and still found a Catholic church that he mentions as Saint George of the Latins, probably built by Jordanus (Saint George was popular among the Malabar Syrian Christians, but also happens to be the Patron Saint of Catalonia). The fact that Quilon is the founding seat of the Catholic Church in India is often found obscured in the midst of history.

Franciscan missionary activity
John De Marignolli (Giovanni de' Marignolli) of St. Lorenzo in Florence, joined the Franciscan order and was consecrated bishop in 1338 AD. He was chosen as legate to China by Pope Benedict XII (1334–1342). He preached in China and on his way back from China, he landed at Quilon and lived there for over a year, preaching in St. George's Church, which was founded by Jordanus.

In 1338 during the Pontificate of Pope Benedict XII (1334–1342) the great Khan of Peking in China sent a great delegation of ambassadors to the Pope at Avignon and were given a royal reception by the Pope. They requested the Pope to send a legate who would be wise, capable and virtuous to care for their souls. Responding to their request the Pope chose John De Marignolli as his legate to China and he accompanied the ambassadors of Great Khan on their homeward journey. Marignolli departed with a great number of friars and precious gifts for Khan, princes and sovereigns. They departed in March 1339 and after a long and perilous journey reached their destination, Khanbalique in 1342 and were received by the Great Khan, who was the last of the Mongol dynasty in China.

After three years of mission Marignolli decided to return to Europe. On his departure on 26 December 1345 he set out for Quilon where he arrived on 23 March 1346. The Christians of Quilon warmly welcomed him. He lived there for over a year, and preached in St. George's Church, founded by Jordanus.

He concentrated himself in the Latin Church of St. George founded by Bishop Jordanus. He preached in this Church and adorned the Church with paintings. He could not do much of missionary activity here since he became sick with dysentery during his stay at Quilon. When he recovered he visited Cape Comorin the extremity of Indian Peninsula where he erected a marble pillar mounted by a cross in full view of Ceylon. It seems that he was an ambitious man and was desirous that the good people of Quilon should never forget him and that was the intention of the erection of the marble pillar. The column, which was to endure till the world's end soon crumbled under the corroding influence of the elements and the inscriptions, were destroyed. Later a wrong tradition developed, attributing this column to St. Thomas. Marignolli set for Sumatra and Ceylon in July 1347. In September 1348 he came back to India. He left India in 1350 AD.

Portuguese control
The Portuguese missionaries made Quilon one of their most important centers of evangelization. St. Francis Xavier laboured here for several years. He established a Seminary in Quilon and his letters to Rome give testimony of a dynamic Christian community in Quilon.

The history of Quilon Diocese from 16th century to 20th century was linked to the battle of European empires for the control of Malabar Coast. The Portuguese who arrived in Quilon in 1503 revived and strengthened the Christian community. They built several churches and monasteries and established new centers of Christianity. Quilon remained a territory under the Franciscans until 1533 AD when the Diocese of Goa was established and Quilon became part of the new Diocese. However, in the year 1557 AD, when Cochin was erected as a suffragan Diocese of the Archdiocese of Goa, Quilon became part of Cochin Diocese.

The Portuguese tenure in Quilon has contributed much to its growth and development. Their primary concern was the abolition of the caste system. They made education available to all communities. They started presses, which were a set-up that made available books in cheaper cost, and thus people began to read and acquire knowledge. It is a little known fact that one of the oldest presses in India was established at Tangasseri. The press was attached to the San Salvador Seminary of the diocese established by a Jesuit Priest, Fr. Jao de Faria. The first book in Kerala "Doctrina Christa" was published from Quilon on 20 October 1578. The Harvard University library possesses a surviving copy of this book. It was printed in the neo-Tamil script of the time in Kerala. The one printed at Quilon, Doctrina Christs en Lingua Malabar Tamil is a translation of St. Francis Xavier's work in Portuguese, translated by Fr. Henrique and Father Manual de San Pedro. The second page of the book mentions that it was printed on 20 October 1578 at the press of the 'Saviour.' Till today that place of the press is known in Tangasseri (near the Bishop's House) as 'Achukuddom Parambu' (Press Place).

Suppression and reestablishment
In 1661 the Portuguese who tasted defeat from the Dutch, left Quilon. The Dutch who took control over Quilon, destroyed Catholic churches and persecuted Catholics. The Christians of Quilon went through a dark period till 1741. The Dutch, defeated by Marthandavarma, the King of Travancore, had to leave Quilon. Yet another dark period for the Church in Quilon was in 1808 when Velu Thampi Dalava unleashed a fierce persecution on Christians.

The Christian community of Quilon after remaining a long period without bishops became a part of the diocese of Goa in 1534, when Goa was made an Episcopal see, suffragan to Funchal in the Madeiras. When Goa was raised to an archbishopric on 4 February 1557, Cochin was made suffragan diocese to the Arch-diocese of Goa and Quilon became part of the Cochin diocese. Pope Gregory XVI created the Vicariate of Malabar by his bull Multa Praeclare of 24 April 1838 and suppressed the diocese of Cochin; and attached that territory along with Quilon to the Vicariate of Malabar (Verapoly). Later the Vicariate of Malabar was divided into three vicariates, Verapoly, Mangalore and Quilon by the Holy See on 12 May 1845. The apostolic vicariate of Quilon was extended from Arabian Sea to the 'Sahyan' Mountains and from Cape Comorin to Pamba River, which was provisionally entrusted to the Belgian discalced Carmelite missionaries.

The separation of Quilon, as a new Vicariate Apostolic, suffragan to Verapoly was decreed and was provisionally executed on 12 May 1845, entrusting it to the Belgian Carmelite Missionaries, and finally confirmed as a separate Vicariate Apostolic on 15 March 1853.

On 24 April 1838 the Holy See established the Vicariate of Malabar with headquarters at Verapoly and Quilon became part of the new vicariate. The separation of Quilon, as a new Vicariate Apostolic, suffragan to Verapoly was decreed and was provisionally executed on 12 May 1845, entrusting it to the Belgian Carmelite Missionaries, and finally confirmed as a separate Vicariate Apostolic on 15 March 1853. With the establishment of the Hierarchy in India, Quilon again became a Diocese on 1 September 1886 with jurisdiction over the territory from Cape Comerin to Pampa River, in the north.

This arrangement was effected in 1853, and on the establishment of the hierarchy in 1886 it was finally elevated into an episcopal see, suffragan to Verapoly.

List of bishops
Latin Rite
 Jordanus Catalani, (1329–1336)
 Bernardino Baccinelli of St. Teresa, (pro-vicar Apostolic, 1845–1853)
 Bernardino Pontanova of St. Agnes, (1853)
 Maurice of St. Albert, (1854)
 Charles Hyacinth Valerga, (1854–1864)
 Ephrem-Edouard-Lucien-Théoponte Garrelon, (20 June 1868 – 3 June 1870)
 Ferdinand Maria Ossi, (23 September 1883 – 16 August 1905)
 Luis María (Alberic Ludwig) Benziger, (16 August 1905 – 23 July 1931)
 Vincent Victor Dereere, (10 February 1936 – 1 July 1937)
 Jerome Maria Fernandez Thuppassery, (25 September 1937 – 30 January 1978)
 Joseph Gabriel Fernandez (30 January 1978 – 16 October 2001)
 Stanley Roman, (16 October 2001 - 18 April 2018)
 Paul Antony Mullassery, (18 April 2018 – present)

Saints and causes for canonisation
 Servant of God Adelrich Benziger (Aloysius of Saint Mary)
 Servant of God Bishop Jerome Fernandez

See also 
John of Montecorvino, (Giovanni Da/di Montecorvino, Monte Corvino) (1246, Montecorvino, Italy – 1328, Peking),
Odoric of Pordenone (real name Odoric Mattiussi or Mattiuzzi) (1286–1331)
 St Andrew's Church, Kovilthottam

References

External links 

GCatholic.org 
Catholic hierarchy  
Catholic Encyclopedia

Organisations based in Kollam
History of Kollam
Quilon
Dioceses in Kerala
Religious organizations established in the 1320s
Religious organizations established in 1886
1329 establishments in Asia
14th-century establishments in India
Dioceses established in the 14th century
Roman Catholic dioceses established in the 14th century
Churches in Kollam district